Leo Buerger (English) (September 13, 1879 in Vienna – October 6, 1943 in New York City) was an Austrian American pathologist, surgeon and urologist. Buerger's disease is named for him.

Family and education 
In 1880s his family emigrated to the United States, and he attended several elementary schools in New York, Chicago, and Philadelphia.

At a New York City college from 1897, he obtained a B.A. degree, then a general M.A. in 1901, followed by medical studies at the (College of Physicians and Surgeons (M.D. 1901). He developed his surgical skills in Germany between 1905 and 1906. There he also studied urology and arterial disease, fields in which he excelled later in life.  

He was married twice; his first wife was Germaine Schnitzer, a French pianist trained in Vienna whom he married in 1913.  They had two children before they divorced in 1927.

Career 

Initially, Buerger practiced at the Lenox Hill Hospital (1901-1904), then the Mount Sinai Hospital (1904–05), then as a volunteer in the surgical clinic at Wrocław with study visits to Vienna and Paris.  From 1907 to 1920, Buerger worked as a pathologist and surgeon at Mount Sinai Hospital. Then in 1908 he gave the first accurate pathological description of thromboangiitis obliterans or Buerger's disease, a disease of the circulatory system associated with smoking first reported by Felix von Winiwarter in 1879.  In the same year, he assisted in the development of the Brown-Buerger cystoscope. For nearly 60 years, it remained the workhorse of the American urology It was the leading cystoscope in the U.S. until the advent of fiberoptic illumination with modern lens systems in the 1970s.He also devised an operating cystoscope in 1910, as well as other urologic instruments. 

Later, as a surgeon, he practiced at several other clinics in New York: Beth David Hospital, Bronx Hospital, and Wyckoff Heights Hospital, Brooklyn. .In 1917 he received a professorship at the Medical Urology Outpatient Clinic New York, which he held until 1930. He then took up a similar position of the College of Medical Evangelists, Los Angeles (California), but worked there for only a short time before returning to New York to work in private practice.

In 1924, he described his eponymous test for lower limb ischemia (Buerger's test). It involves the observation of color changes of the foot during elevation and lowering of the lower limb.  He is credited for many other developments in the field of vascular pathology. Aside from discovering Buerger disease and Buerger's test, he authored the book "Circulatory Disturbances of the Extremities". He is also credited with developing the Buerger’s exercises or Buerger-Allen exercises which were later modified by Arthus Allen.  The exercises intend to improve lower limb circulation. The legs are held at 45 to 90 degrees until the skin blanches. They are then lowered below the level of the rest of the body at 90 degrees. Finally, the patient is laid flat in bed. Typical times for each step are  2 to 3 minutes in an elevated position, 5 to 10 minutes dependent, and then flat on the bed for 10 minutes.

He also worked in the field of bacteriology, including contributions to differentiate streptococci and pneumococci.

Publications
Buerger alone or in collaboration wrote more than 160 articles in various scientific journals.

 Thrombo-Angiitis Obliterans: A study of the vascular lesions leading to presenile spontaneous gangrene. Am J Med Sci 136 (1908) 567
 The pathology of the vessels in cases of gangrene of the lower extremities due to so-called endarteritis obliterans. Proc NY Pathol Soc 8 (1908) 48 Proc Soc NY Pathol 8 (1908) 48
 Diseases of the Circulatory Extremities. 1924

References 

  E. J. Wormer: Angiology - Phlebology. Syndromes and their creators. Munich 1991, pp 225–234
  P. Rentchnick: Le centenaire de la naissance du Dr Leo Buerger. 192 Méd Hygiène 38 (1980) 192
  G. W. Kaplan: Leo Buerger (1879-1973). Invest Urol 11 (1974) 342-3
  A. Birch: Leo Buerger, 1879-1943. Practitioner 211 (1973) 823
  S. Kagan: Jewish Medicine. Boston 1952, p. 71

American pathologists
Austrian pathologists
Austrian urologists
Austro-Hungarian emigrants to the United States
Jewish physicians
Scientists from Vienna
1879 births
1943 deaths